Ognjen Dobrić (born 27 October 1994) is a Serbian professional basketball player for Crvena zvezda of the Adriatic League and the EuroLeague.

Career
Ognjen grew up with Crvena zvezda youth teams and signed his first professional contract in December 2012.

Dobrić signed a four-year deal with KK Crvena zvezda on September 21, 2016, after previously playing on loan for FMP for three seasons. He scored his ABA League high score of 17 points against KK Olimpija Ljubljana, and his Euroleague high of 17 points in loss to Baskonia Vitoria Gasteiz. On July 6, 2019, Dobrić signed a two-year contract extension for the Zvezda. He averaged 5.1 points per game. On 8 September 2020, Dobrić signed a two-year contract extension with the Zvezda. On 12 December 2020, Dobrić recorded his 250 apperiences for the Zvezda. He re-signed with the team on 6 July 2021.

Career statistics

Euroleague

|-
| style="text-align:left;"| 2016–17
| style="text-align:left;"| Crvena zvezda
| 13 || 0 || 5.3 || .409 || .167 || .333 || .5 || .2 || .3 || .0 || 1.6 || .6
|-
| style="text-align:left;"| 2017–18
| style="text-align:left;"| Crvena zvezda
| 26 || 1 || 15.2 || .452 || .351 || .826 || 2.3 || .4 || .6 || .2 || 6.5 || 6.1
|-
| style="text-align:left;"| 2019–20
| style="text-align:left;"| Crvena zvezda
| 22 || 3 || 14.4 || .467 || .357 || .684 || 1.7 || .9 || .8 || .2 || 5.1 || 5.3
|-
| style="text-align:left;"| 2020–21
| style="text-align:left;"| Crvena zvezda
| 32 || 7 || 18.4 || .431 || .456 || .857 || 2.0 || .8 || .9 || .2 || 8.3 || 7.0
|-
|- class="sortbottom"
| style="text-align:center;" colspan="2"| Career
| 93 || 11 || 15.7 || .441 || .392 || .798 || 1.8 || .6 || .7 || .1 || 6.1 || 6.1

See also 
 List of KK Crvena zvezda players with 100 games played

References

External links

 Profile at aba-liga.com
 Profile at eurobasket.com
 Profile at euroleague.net

1994 births
Living people
ABA League players
Basketball League of Serbia players
Croatian expatriate basketball people in Serbia
KK Crvena zvezda players
KK FMP players
People from the Republic of Serbian Krajina
Serbian men's basketball players
Serbs of Croatia
Small forwards
Sportspeople from Knin
Yugoslav Wars refugees